Saipan is a Pacific island that is part of the Mariana Islands archipelago. It is one of the 14 islands that constitute the Northern Mariana Islands, an unincorporated territory of the United States.

Saipan may also refer to:

Geography
 Saipan International Airport, an airport in Saipan
 Saipan International School, an international school
 Saipan Katori Shrine, a Shintō shrine 
 Saipan Southern High School, a senior high school

History
 Battle of Saipan, a World War II battle

Military
 Saipan class aircraft carrier, built by the United States Navy during World War II
 USS Saipan (CVL-48), the lead ship of the class
 USS Saipan (LHA-2), a Tarawa-class amphibious assault ship

Sports
 "The Saipan Incident", a public falling-out between Irish football player Roy Keane and manager Mick McCarthy prior to the 2002 FIFA World Cup

Games
 Saipan: Conquest of the Marianas, a 1975 board wargame that simulates the World War II battle

Flora and fauna
 Saipan Jungle Fowl, a breed of chicken
 Saipan reed warbler, a critically endangered songbird

Other
 Saipan Sucks, a political website

See also
 Sipan (disambiguation)